Dogface is a British sketch comedy television series which debuted on E4 in September 2007. The show consists of sketches sometimes interspersed with animations featuring dogs sitting at tables talking as "lads" talk, with much reference to booze, birds and other lad culture stereotypes. The series is produced by Objective Productions.

References

External links

2007 British television series debuts
2007 British television series endings
2000s British comedy television series
E4 sketch shows
Television series by All3Media
English-language television shows